Muzi may refer to:

Muzi language
Hajjiabad-e Muzi, Iran
, a town in Gangnan District, Guangxi, China

People
Muzi Mei
Muzi Dlamini
Muzi Epifani
 Muzi (musician)